"Ya Di Ya" is a song by American R&B singer, Gina Thompson. It features guest vocals by Missy "Misdemeanor" Elliott and was released as the lead single from Thompson's unreleased album, If You Only Knew (1999).

The song became a minor hit, where it peaked at #38 on Billboard Hot R&B/Hip-Hop Songs and scored Thompson her second top 40 R&B hit and Elliott's fifteenth overall top 40 R&B hit. Because of its strong radio airplay and charting outside the United States, a "Rufftime" remix was issued via international pressings of "Ya Di Ya".

To date, "Ya Di Ya" is Thompson's only single as a leading artist to chart outside the United States.

Music video
The music video for the song premiered in early July 1999 on The Box. It begins with Gina Thompson, alongside background dancers dressed in white, dancing and lip-syncing to the song. Thompson is then seen arguing with the song's antagonist over the phone before throwing the phone in a fish-tank. Missy Elliott is later shown in a silver attire performing her part.

Track listings and formats
 German 12" vinyl
 "Ya Di Ya" (Album Version) – 4:20   
 "Ya Di Ya" (Rufftime Remix) – 3:53   
 "Ya Di Ya" (Album Instrumental) – 4:20   
 "Ya Di Ya" (Rufftime Remix) – 3:53   
 "Take My Number Down" (Album Version) – 3:57

 German CD single
 "Ya Di Ya" (Rufftime Remix) – 3:53   
 "Ya Di Ya" (Original Radio Edit) – 3:50   
 "Take My Number Down" (Album Version) – 3:57

 US CD Maxi/12" vinyl
 "Ya Di Ya" (LP Version) (featuring Missy Elliott) – 4:22   
 "Ya Di Ya" (Radio Version) (featuring Missy Elliott) – 3:51   
 "Ya Di Ya (Instrumental) – 4:22   
 "Take My Number Down (LP Version) – 4:02   
 "Take My Number Down (Instrumental) – 4:00   
 "Ya Di Ya" (Acappella) (featuring Missy Elliott) – 4:19

 US CD single
 "Ya Di Ya" (Original Radio Edit) (featuring Missy Elliott) – 3:50
 "Take My Number Down" (Album Version) – 3:57

Chart performance

References

1999 singles
1999 songs
Missy Elliott songs
Hip hop soul songs